The Home Computer Course was a partwork magazine published by Orbis Publishing in the United Kingdom during 1983 and 1984, covering the subject of home computer technology. It ran for 24 weekly issues, before being succeeded by The Home Computer Advanced Course.

Each issue contained articles on various topics, including computer hardware, software, computer applications, a "Questions and Answers" column, BASIC programming and an in-depth review of a contemporary microcomputer, with annotated exploded view photos of its internals.

See also
Input Magazine

References

External links
TV advert for The Home Computer Course on TVARK

Defunct computer magazines published in the United Kingdom
Home computer magazines
Weekly magazines published in the United Kingdom
Magazines established in 1983
Magazines disestablished in 1984
Magazines published in London
Partworks